Abdul Hadi Zaqlam or simply Howeidi (born 18 June 1991), is a Libyan professional footballer who currently plays for Al-Hilal.

References

External links
 Abdul Hadi Zaqlam at Goalzz.com
 

Libyan footballers
1991 births
Living people
Association football midfielders
Libyan expatriate footballers
Libyan expatriate sportspeople in Iraq
Al-Mina'a SC players
Expatriate footballers in Iraq